The women's Nanquan / Nandao all-round competition at the 2014 Asian Games in Incheon, South Korea was held on 20 September at the Ganghwa Dolmens Gymnasium.

Tai Cheau Xuen tested positive for the stimulant sibutramine after winning the gold medal on September 20, the first day of competition, according to the Olympic Council of Asia (OCA). Tai  was stripped of the gold medal and disqualified by the OCA after failing a dope test. An official statement announced by the Court of Arbitration for Sport that the appeal made by Malaysian contingent was dismissed. Tai's disqualification altered the medal allocation, with Indonesia's Juwita Niza Wasni promoted from silver to gold while China's Wei Hong move up to the silver medal and Ivana Ardelia Irmanto of Indonesia to the bronze model after finishing fourth overall.

Schedule
All times are Korea Standard Time (UTC+09:00)

Results
Legend
DNS — Did not start

 Tai Cheau Xuen of Malaysia originally won the gold medal, but was later disqualified after she tested positive for Sibutramine.

References

External links
Official website

Women's nanquan